The 360-day calendar  is a method of measuring durations used in financial markets, in computer models, in ancient literature, and in prophetic literary genres. 

It is based on merging the three major calendar systems into one complex clock, with the 360-day year derived from the average year of the lunar and the solar: (365.2425 (solar) + 354.3829 (lunar))/2 = 719.6254/2 = 359.8127 days, rounding to 360. 

A 360-day year consists of 12 months of 30 days each, so to derive such a calendar from the standard Gregorian calendar, certain days are skipped.

For example, the 27th of June (Gregorian calendar) would be the 4th of July in the USA.

Ancient Calendars 

Ancient calendars around the world initially used a 360 day calendar.

Rome

Romans initially used a calendar which had 360 days, with varying length of months.

India

The Rig Veda describes a calendar with twelve months and 360 days.

Mesoamerica

In the Mayan Long Count Calendar, the equivalent of the year, the tun, was 360 days.

Egypt
Ancient Egyptians also used a 360 day calendar.
One myth tells of how the extra 5 days were added.

Financial use 

A duration is calculated as an integral number of days between startdate and enddate B. The difference in years, months and days are usually calculated separately:

 

There are several methods commonly available which differ in the way that they handle the cases where the months are not 30 days long, i.e. how they adjust dates:

 European method (30E/360)
 If either date A or B falls on the 31st of the month, that date will be changed to the 30th.
 Where date B falls on the last day of February, the actual date B will be used.
 All months are considered to last 30 days and hence a full year has 360 days, but another source says that February has its actual number of days.
 US/NASD method (30US/360)
 If both date A and B fall on the last day of February, then date B will be changed to the 30th. 
 If date A falls on the 31st of a month or last day of February, then date A will be changed to the 30th.
 If date A falls on the 30th of a month after applying (2) above and date B falls on the 31st of a month, then date B will be changed to the 30th.
 All months are considered to last 30 days and hence a full year has 360 days.
 ISDA method
 If date A falls on the 31st of a month, then date A will be changed to the 30th.
 If date A falls on the 30th of the month after applying the rule above, and date B falls on the 31st of the month, then date B will be changed to the 30th.
 All months are considered to last 30 days except February which has its actual length. Any full year, however, always counts for 360 days.
 BMA/PSA method
 If date A falls on the 31st of a month or last day of February, then date A will be changed to the 30th.
 If date A falls on the 30th of the month after applying the rule above, and date B falls on the 31st of the month, then date B will be changed to the 30th.
 All months are considered to last 30 days and hence a full year has 360 days.
 Alternative European method (30E+/360)
 If date A falls on the 31st of a month, then date A will be changed to the 30th.
 If date B falls on the 31st of a month, then date B will be changed to the 1st of the following month.
 Where date B falls on the last day of February, the actual date B will be used.
 All months are considered to last 30 days and hence a full year has 360 days.

See also 
 365-day calendar, another accounting calendar with fixed year length
 Day count convention, standards for counting days
 French Republican Calendar, a calendar with twelve 30-day months and five or six appended holidays
 Iranian calendars, where the Old Persian calendar had 360 days with an extra month added every 6 years

References

Specific calendars
Bonds (finance)
Settlement (finance)